The Feast of Corpus Christi, also known as the Solemnity of the Most Holy Body and Blood of Christ, is a Christian liturgical solemnity celebrating the Real Presence of the Body and Blood, Soul and Divinity of Jesus Christ in the elements of the Eucharist; it is observed by the Roman Catholic Church, in addition to certain Western Orthodox, Lutheran, and Anglican churches. Two months earlier, the institution of the Eucharist at the Last Supper is observed on Maundy Thursday in a sombre atmosphere leading to Good Friday. The liturgy on that day also commemorates Christ's washing of the disciples' feet, the institution of the priesthood, and the agony in the Garden of Gethsemane.

The feast of Corpus Christi was proposed by Saint Thomas Aquinas, Doctor of the Church, to Pope Urban IV, in order to create a feast focused solely on the Holy Eucharist, emphasizing the joy of the Eucharist being the Body and Blood, Soul and Divinity of Jesus Christ. Having recognized in 1264 the authenticity of the Eucharistic Miracle of Bolsena, on input of Aquinas, the pontiff, then living in Orvieto, established the feast of Corpus Christi as a Solemnity and extended it to the whole Roman Catholic Church.

The feast is liturgically celebrated on the Thursday after Trinity Sunday or, "where the Solemnity of The Most Holy Body and Blood of Christ is not a holy day of obligation, it is assigned to the Sunday after the Most Holy Trinity as its proper day".

At the end of Holy Mass, there is often a procession of the Blessed Sacrament, generally displayed in a monstrance. The procession is followed by the Benediction of the Blessed Sacrament. A notable Eucharistic procession is that presided over by the Pope each year in Rome, where it begins at the Archbasilica of St. John Lateran and passes to the Basilica of Saint Mary Major, where it concludes with the aforementioned Benediction. Corpus Christi wreaths, which are made of flowers, are hung on the doors and windows of the Christian faithful, in addition to being erected in gardens and fields.

The celebration of the feast was suppressed in Protestant churches during the Reformation for theological reasons: outside Lutheranism, which maintained the confession of the Real Presence, many Protestants denied the real presence of Christ in the Eucharist other than as a merely symbolic or spiritual presence. Today, most Protestant denominations do not recognize the feast day, with exception of certain Lutheran churches and the Church of England, the latter of which abolished it in 1548 as the English Reformation progressed, but later reintroduced it. Some Anglican churches now observe Corpus Christi, sometimes under the name "Thanksgiving for Holy Communion".

History

Juliana of Liège

The institution of Corpus Christi as a feast in the Christian calendar resulted from approximately forty years of work on the part of Juliana of Liège, a 13th-century Norbertine canoness, also known as Juliana de Cornillon, born in 1191 or 1192 in Liège, Belgium, a city where there were groups of women dedicated to Eucharistic worship. Guided by exemplary priests, they lived together, devoted to prayer and to charitable works. Orphaned at the age of five, she and her sister Agnes were entrusted to the care of the Augustinian nuns at the convent and leprosarium of Mont-Cornillon, where Juliana developed a special veneration for the Blessed Sacrament.

She always longed for a feast day outside of Lent in its honour. Her vita reports that this desire was enhanced by a vision of the church under the appearance of the full moon having one dark spot, which signified the absence of such a solemnity. In 1208, she reported her first vision of Christ in which she was instructed to plead for the institution of the feast of Corpus Christi. The vision was repeated for the next 20 years but she kept it a secret. When she eventually relayed it to her confessor, he relayed it to the bishop.

Juliana also petitioned the learned Dominican Hugh of St-Cher, and Robert de Thorete, Bishop of Liège. At that time bishops could order feasts in their dioceses, so Bishop Robert ordered in 1246 a celebration of Corpus Christi to be held in the diocese each year thereafter on the Thursday after Trinity Sunday. The first such celebration occurred at St Martin's Church in the city that same year.

Hugh of St-Cher travelled to Liège as Cardinal-Legate in 1251 and, finding that the feast was not being observed, reinstated it. In the following year, he established the feast for his whole jurisdiction (Germany, Dacia, Bohemia, and Moravia), to be celebrated on the Thursday after the Octave of Trinity (one week later than had been indicated for Liège), but with a certain elasticity, for he granted an indulgence for all who confessed their sins and attended church "on a date and in a place where [the feast] was celebrated".

Jacques Pantaléon of Troyes was also won over to the cause of the Feast of Corpus Christi during his ministry as Archdeacon in Liège under the diocesan bishop Robert of Thourotte. It was he who, having become Pope as Urban IV in 1264, instituted the Solemnity of Corpus Christi on the Thursday after Pentecost as a feast for the entire Latin Church, by the papal bull Transiturus de hoc mundo. The legend that this act was inspired by a procession to Orvieto in 1263, after a village priest in Bolsena and his congregation witnessed a Eucharistic miracle of a bleeding consecrated host at Bolsena, has been called into question by scholars who note problems in the dating of the alleged miracle, whose tradition begins in the 14th century, and the interests of Urban IV, a former Archdeacon in Liège. 

Though this was the first papally imposed universal feast for the Latin Church, it was not widely celebrated for half a century. It was adopted by a number of dioceses in Germany and by the Cistercians, and in 1295 was celebrated in Venice. It became a truly universal feast only after the bull of Urban IV was included in the collection of laws known as the Clementines, compiled under Pope Clement V, but promulgated only by his successor Pope John XXII in 1317.

While the institution of the Eucharist is celebrated on Holy (Maundy) Thursday, the liturgy on that day also commemorates Christ's washing of the disciples' feet, the institution of the priesthood and the agony in the Garden of Gethsemane. So many other functions took place on this day that the principal event was almost lost sight of. This is mentioned in the Bull Transiturus as the chief reason for the introduction of the new feast. Hence, the feast of Corpus Christi was established to create a feast focused solely on the Holy Eucharist.

Three versions of the office for the feast of Corpus Christi in extant manuscripts provide evidence for the Liège origins and voice of Juliana in an original office, which was followed by two later versions of the office. A highly sophisticated and polished version can be found in BNF 1143, a musical manuscript devoted entirely to the feast, upon which there is wide scholarly agreement: the version in BNF 1143 is a revision of an earlier version found in Prague, Abbey of Strahov MS D.E.I. 7, and represents the work of Thomas Aquinas following or during his residency at Orvieto from 1259 to 1265. The office can also be found in the 1343 codex Regimen Animarum. This liturgy may be used as a votive Mass of the Blessed Sacrament on weekdays in ordinary time. The hymn Aquinas composed for Vespers of Corpus Christi, Pange Lingua or another eucharistic hymn, is also used on Maundy Thursday during the procession of the Blessed Sacrament to the altar of repose. 

The last two verses of Pange Lingua are also used as a separate hymn, Tantum Ergo, which is sung at Benediction of the Blessed Sacrament. O Salutaris Hostia, another hymn sung at Benediction of the Blessed Sacrament, comprises the last two verses of Verbum Supernum Prodiens, Aquinas' hymn for Lauds of Corpus Christi. Aquinas also composed the propers for the Mass of Corpus Christi, including the sequence Lauda Sion Salvatorem. The epistle reading for the Mass was taken from Paul's First Epistle to the Corinthians, and the Gospel reading was taken from the Gospel of John.

When Pope Pius V revised the General Roman Calendar (see Tridentine Calendar), Corpus Christi was one of only two "feasts of devotion" that he kept, the other being Trinity Sunday. In that calendar, Corpus Christi was celebrated on the Thursday after Trinity Sunday. The feast had an octave until 1955, when Pope Pius XII suppressed all octaves, even in local calendars, except those of Christmas, Easter and Pentecost (see General Roman Calendar of Pope Pius XII).

From 1849 until 1969, a separate Feast of the Most Precious Blood of Our Lord Jesus Christ was assigned originally to the first Sunday in July, later to the first day of the month. This feast was removed from the General Roman Calendar in 1969, "because the Most Precious Blood of Christ the Redeemer is already venerated in the solemnities of the Passion, of Corpus Christi and of the Sacred Heart of Jesus and in the feast of the Exaltation of the Holy Cross. But the Mass of the Most Precious Blood of Our Lord Jesus Christ is placed among the votive Masses".

Celebration

Roman Catholic Church
The feast of Corpus Christi is one of five occasions in the year on which a diocesan bishop is not to be away from his diocese unless for a grave and urgent reason.

In many countries, the day is a holy day of obligation to participate in the celebration of Mass and takes place on the Thursday after Trinity Sunday. On that day or on the following Sunday, which is the feast day where it is not a holy day of obligation, it is traditional to hold in the streets of a town or in an individual parish a procession with prayers and singing to honor the Blessed Sacrament. German processional hymns include the 1687 "Kommt her, ihr Kreaturen all". During the procession, the consecrated host is displayed in a monstrance held aloft by a member of the clergy. At the end of the procession, Benediction of the Blessed Sacrament is imparted.

Anglicanism
The celebration of Corpus Christi was abolished in England in 1548. However, in the Church of England "the Thursday after Trinity Sunday may be observed as The Day of Thanksgiving for the Institution of Holy Communion (Corpus Christi)" as one of the church's Festivals and with a special liturgy.

The feast is also celebrated by Anglo-Catholic parishes, even in provinces of the Anglican Communion that do not officially include it in their calendars. McCausland's Order of Divine Service, the most commonly used ordo in the Anglican Church of Canada, provides lections for the day.

Other churches

Corpus Christi is also celebrated by the Old Catholic Church, the Liberal Catholic Church and by some Western Rite Orthodox Christians. It is commemorated in the liturgical calendars of the more Latinized Eastern Catholic Churches.

Lutheranism

Martin Luther spoke out against processing with the consecrated elements, which he viewed as "only play-acting" and "just vain idolatry". In one of his postils (homilies), he wrote

However, the feast was retained in the calendars of the Lutheran Church until about 1600.

Calvinism

Like Lutherans, followers of the Reformed tradition do not observe the feast.

Folk traditions
On the eve of the Feast of Corpus Christi, clergy bless Corpus Christi wreaths that are made of flowers. Corpus Christi wreaths and bouquets are often "attached to flags and banners, to houses, and to the arches of green boughs that span the streets." In Christian homes, these Corpus Christi wreaths are suspended on walls or displayed on doors and in windows. Corpus Christi wreaths are also "put up in gardens, fields, and pastures, with a prayer for protection and blessing upon the growing harvest."

Throughout Christendom, "the custom developed of carrying the Blessed Sacrament in a splendid procession through the town after the Mass on Corpus Christi Day." The monstrance which holds the host is surrounded by a Corpus Christi wreath of flowers. During the procession, church bells are rung and "the faithful kneel in front of their homes to adore the Eucharistic Lord." Along the route in which the procession occurs, Christian homes "are decorated with little birch trees and green boughs", with candles being lit in the windows. Oftentimes, stops are made at various points called "stations" during the procession and "the Blessed Sacrament is put on an altar table" while a Gospel passage is read and hymns are sung, along with prayer being made.

England
In medieval times in many parts of Europe, Corpus Christi was a time for the performance of mystery plays. The plays in York, England, were performed on Corpus Christi Day for some 200 years until their suppression in the sixteenth century during the Protestant Reformation.

Peru
In the southern highlands of the Cusco Region of Peru, the festival of Quyllurit'i is held near Corpus Christi in the Sinaqara Valley. As many as 10,000 pilgrims come from neighboring areas. Culminating on Trinity Sunday, this festival marks the return in the sky of the Pleiades constellation, known in the Quechua language as Qullqa, or "storehouse", as it is associated with the upcoming harvest and New Year. The festival precedes the official feast of Corpus Christi, held the Thursday following Trinity Sunday, but it is closely associated with it.

Poland

In Spycimierz in central Poland (Gmina Uniejów), parishioners arrange a carpet of live flowers about one kilometre long. A solemn procession passes over it at 5 pm.  Long carpets of flowers are also laid in four parishes in the Opole Voivodship in southern Poland. Flower carpets tradition for Corpus Christi processions was inscribed on the UNESCO Representative List of the Intangible Cultural Heritage of Humanity in 2021.

Spain

Andalucia
The celebrations in Seville are depicted in a section of Iberia, the masterpiece of the composer Albéniz.

Castile-La Mancha
Corpus Christi is one of the main festivals in Toledo, Spain.

Castile and León
In the village of Castrillo de Murcia near Burgos, the celebration includes the practice of El Colacho (baby jumping).

Catalonia

In Catalonia, Corpus Christi is celebrated with the tradition of the dancing egg. There is evidence this tradition dates from the 16th century.

The Patum de Berga is a popular and traditional festival that is celebrated each year in the Catalan city of Berga (Barcelona) during Corpus Christi. It consists of a series of "dances" (balls) by townspeople dressed as mystical and symbolical figures. The balls are marked by their solemnity and their ample use of fire and pyrotechnics. It was declared a Traditional Festival of National Interest by the Generalitat de Catalunya in 1983, and as a Masterpiece of the Oral and Intangible Heritage of Humanity by UNESCO in 2005.

Date 

Corpus Christi is a moveable feast, celebrated on the Thursday after Trinity Sunday, 60 days after Easter, or, in countries where it is not a holy day of obligation, on the following Sunday.

The earliest possible Thursday celebration falls on 21 May (as in 1818 and 2285), the latest on 24 June (as in 1943 and 2038). The Sunday celebration of the feast, introduced in the second half of the 20th century, occurs three days later, between 24 May at earliest (for the first time in 2285) and 27 June at latest (for the first time in 2038). For Western Rite Orthodox Christians, since they use the Julian Calendar, at least for all Feast Days dependent on the date of Pascha, their date of the celebration of Corpus Christi, translates to, in the Gregorian Calendar, from 3 June at the earliest, to 7 July, at the latest.

Corpus Christi is a public holiday in some countries with a predominantly Catholic population including, among others, Argentina, Austria, Bolivia, parts of Bosnia and Herzegovina, Brazil, Colombia, Croatia, Dominican Republic, East Timor, Equatorial Guinea, parts of Germany, Grenada, Haiti, Jerusalem in Israel, Liechtenstein, Monaco, Paraguay, Peru, Poland, Portugal, parts of Puerto Rico, Saint Lucia, San Marino, Spain, parts of Switzerland, Trinidad and Tobago, parts of the United States, and Venezuela.

See also

 Adoro te devote
 Dancing devils of Corpus Christi
 Feast of the Most Pure Heart of Mary
 Feast of the Sacred Heart
 Lauda Sion
 List of festivals in Costa Rica
 Pange Lingua Gloriosi Corporis Mysterium
 Sacris solemniis
 Spello's Infiorate
 Transubstantiation
 Verbum Supernum Prodiens

References

External links

 Corpus Christi, with order for procession at www.therealpresence.org
 Feast of Corpus Christi: History
 Carthusians and Corpus Christi
 Corpus Christi background, from www.haverford.edu
 Traditional Corpus Christi celebrations in Panama
 Thomas M Landy, "Feasts, Processions & Festivals", Catholics & Cultures updated 12 June 2017

Thursday
Latin religious words and phrases
Eucharist in the Catholic Church
Anglican Eucharistic theology
Lutheran Eucharistic theology
Catholic holy days
Catholic liturgy
May observances
June observances
Holidays based on the date of Easter
Public holidays in Croatia
Public holidays in Austria
Festivals in Costa Rica
Christian processions
Corpus Christi